CIDC may refer to:

CIDC-FM, a radio station in Ontario
Coney Island Development Corporation, New York
United States Army Criminal Investigation Command